And So I Watch You from Afar is a Northern Irish instrumental rock band from Belfast, composed of guitarists Rory Friers and Niall Kennedy, bassist Ewen Friers and drummer Chris Wee.

The band released two albums with former member Tony Wright, who was replaced by Niall Kennedy in 2011. The band signed with Richter Collective, and in October 2011 announced a deal in North America with management and record label Sargent House.

They released their self-titled debut studio album on April 13, 2009. Their second studio album, Gangs (2011), was met with favorable reviews. The band released their third studio album, All Hail Bright Futures, on March 15, 2013 on Sargent House. Their fourth studio album, Heirs (2015). Their fifth studio album, The Endless Shimmering, was released on October 20, 2017.

Band members
Current Members

 Rory Friers – guitar
 Niall Kennedy – guitar
 Ewen Friers – bass
 Chris Wee – drums, percussion

Former members
 Jonathan Adger – bass guitar
 Tony Wright – guitar

Discography

Studio albums

Singles

References

External links 

 

Musical groups established in 2005
Musical groups from Belfast
Equal Vision Records artists
Post-rock groups from Northern Ireland
Sargent House artists